"Dizzy, Miss Lizzy" is a rock and roll song written and recorded by Larry Williams in 1958. Although identified as a "genuine rock & roll classic", it had limited success on the record charts. Seven years later, the Beatles recorded the song, and John Lennon performed it with the Plastic Ono Band in 1969.

Recording
At the end of 1957, Williams scored with one of his biggest hits, "Bony Moronie". On February 19, 1958, he entered the Radio Recorders studio in Hollywood, California, to record a potential follow-up. He was again was backed by some well-known session musicians, including René Hall, who is credited as the band leader and with supplying the distinctive guitar riff.  However, it is Williams' vocal that makes the song stand out, according to music journalist Gene Sculatti, "at ease with its own intensity [that is] finally out of Richard's shadow" (Little Richard and Williams were both signed to Specialty Records).

Release and charts
Specialty released "Dizzy, Miss Lizzy" on both the 78 rpm and newer 45 rpm record formats. Williams had several completed recordings to choose from, but the label decided to go with "Slow Down", a track he had recorded at the same September 11, 1957, session that produced "Bony Moronie".  Both sides received notices in Billboard magazine, but only "Dizzy, Miss Lizzy" reached the "Top 100 Sides" chart. It peaked at number 69 during the week ending April 19, 1958.  Both songs were included on Williams's first album, the Specialty compilation Here's Larry Williams (1959).

Personnel
 Larry Williams – vocals, piano
 Earl Palmer – drums
 René Hall – guitar
 Howard Roberts – guitar
 Ted Brinson – bass guitar
 Plas Johnson – tenor sax
 Jewell Grant – baritone sax

The Beatles rendition

In 1965, the Beatles recorded "Dizzy Miss Lizzy" in response to requests from Capitol Records (their US record label) for new material.  The song is included on the UK album Help! and the US album Beatles VI.  They recorded it along with another Williams tune, "Bad Boy", on the same day.

Group biographer Ian MacDonald describes the song as "an unprepossessing shambles of ersatz hysteria and jumbled double-tracking".  However, AllMusic's Stephen Thomas Erlewine comments "'Dizzy Miss Lizzy' gives John an opportunity to flex his rock & roll muscle."

Lennon later recorded "Dizzy Miss Lizzy" at a performance at the Toronto Rock and Roll Revival on September 13, 1969.  The song is included on the Plastic Ono Band album Live Peace in Toronto 1969.

The Beatles personnel
In Revolution in the Head, MacDonald lists the following:
John Lennon – vocal, rhythm guitar, Vox Continental organ
Paul McCartney – bass
George Harrison – double-tracked lead guitar
Ringo Starr – drums, cowbell

References

Songs written by Larry Williams
1958 songs
1958 singles
Larry Williams songs
Dizzy Miss Lizzy
Dizzy Miss Lizzy
Specialty Records singles